Life Without Buildings were a Glasgow, Scotland-based indie rock band.

Career
Named after a track by English new wave band Japan, Life Without Buildings formed during the summer of 1999. The band consisted mostly of ex-students of the Glasgow School of Art, Initial band members were Will Bradley (drums), Chris Evans (bass) and Robert Johnston (guitar). Painter Sue Tompkins (vocals) joined later in 1999. The band split writing duties, with Johnston, Bradley and Evans writing the music while Tompkins wrote the vocals. Tompkins' "talk-sung" vocal styling eventually became the band's most famous attribute. Impressed after their first London gig, the Rough Trade-affiliated Tugboat label asked the band to record a debut single.

Released in March 2000, "The Leanover" b/w "New Town" secured the band a full deal with the label. "New Town" received some airplay on BBC Radio 1. The band later released two more singles on the Tugboat label. The band's debut, Any Other City, recorded by Scottish producer Andy Miller at Chem19 Studios in Glasgow, was released in 2001 in the UK; label DCBaltimore2012 issued it months later in the United States.

Life Without Buildings were on the same bill as The Strokes in February 2001, during the latter band's first headlining gig. A popular legend sprung up that due to the Strokes' popularity, Life Without Buildings was bumped further down the bill. Band members disputed this, saying that while they had been scheduled to play the show, it was the result of a booking error, not anything intentional.

In January 2002 Any Other City debuted at #49 on the CMJ Radio 200. It stayed on the Radio 200 for eight weeks, peaking at #22.

Break-up
The band broke up in 2002, after the release of Any Other City. In a 2009 interview with Muso's Guide, guitarist Johnston stated the band broke up because Tompkins wanted to focus on her career as a visual artist. He went on to stress that none of the band members ever envisioned turning music into a career, and they felt pressure because something that had started "for a laugh" had become serious.

In May 2007 a live album was released in Europe called Live at the Annandale Hotel on the Gargleblast Records label, and was subsequently released in North America in August 2007 on Absolutely Kosher Records. Recorded around December 2002 at Sydney's Annandale Hotel, band members claimed to be unaware that the show was recorded, but were happy with the finished live record.

As of 2009, the band has stated no desire to either re-form or play one-off shows. Johnston went on to work as a graphic designer. Bradley became a writer, while Evans and Tompkins work as visual artists.

Any Other City was reissued on vinyl in the United States for the first time on April 19, 2014 for Record Store Day. The vinyl reissue included a reproduction of their debut 7", featuring rougher original versions of "The Leanover" and "New Town".

Discography

Albums
Any Other City (2001)
Live at the Annandale Hotel (2007)

Singles
The band released three singles on Tugboat Records and one on Trifekta Records:
 "The Leanover" / "New Town" (2000) (Double A Side)
 "Is Is and the IRS" / "Lets Get Out (New Version)" (2000) (Double A Side)
 "Young Offenders" / "Daylighting" (Double A Side)
 "Love Trinity" / "Is Is and the IRS" / "Daylighting" (Australia only)

References

External links
 Life Without buildings myspace
 

Musical groups from Glasgow
Scottish indie rock groups
Absolutely Kosher Records artists
Gargleblast Records artists